Atul Kinagi is an Indian actor, working in film and television industry. He made his Bollywood debut with the supporting role in Hindi film Jashnn, directed by Raksha Mistry, alongside Anjana Sukhani and Adhyayan Suman. In 2014, he started his television career with the role of Jai Mahanto Jagannath in Anil V. Kumar's soap opera Main Naa Bhoolungi, alongside Aishwarya Sakhuja and Vikas Manaktala.

Filmography

References

Living people
Male actors in Hindi cinema
Indian male television actors
Year of birth missing (living people)
21st-century Indian male actors